Notre-Dame-d'Allençon is a former commune in the Maine-et-Loire department in western France. On 1 January 2017, it was merged into the new commune Terranjou.

See also
Communes of the Maine-et-Loire department

References

Notredamedallencon